The 1933 Macdonald Brier, the Canadian men's national curling championship, was held from March 7 to 9, 1933 at the Granite Club in Toronto, Ontario.

Team Alberta, who was skipped by Cliff Manahan snapped Manitoba's five year reign as champions and captured their first Brier Tankard with a 6-1 record in round robin play. Both Team Manitoba and Team Ontario would finish tied for second in round robin play with 5-2 records, necessitating a tiebreaker playoff for the runner-up spot. Ontario defeated Manitoba 12-8 in the playoff to finish runner-up.

This was the first Brier in which none of the games went to an extra end.

Event Summary
Coming into the 1933 edition of the Brier, Team Manitoba had won five straight Brier champions (a record that still stands as of ). Heading into the last draw (Draw 7), Team Alberta led with a 5-1 record while Team Manitoba and Team Ontario were one game back with 4-2 records. 

For Manitoba to have a shot in collecting their sixth straight Brier Tankard, they would have to defeat Alberta to force a tiebreaker playoff. Ontario was still in the mix for the tankard as well, needing a win over Nova Scotia and an Alberta loss to join both Alberta and Manitoba in the tiebreaker playoff. An Alberta win would clinch the championship for them.

Ontario did their job by defeating Nova Scotia 16-5 in 10 ends, but Alberta secured their first Brier Tankard with a convincing 11-3 win over Manitoba in 10 ends. Ontario defeated Manitoba in the tiebreaker game for runner-up 12-8.

Teams
The teams are listed as follows:

Round Robin standings

Round Robin results

Draw 1

Draw 2

Draw 3

Draw 4

Draw 5

Draw 6

Draw 7

Tiebreaker

References 

Macdonald Brier, 1933
Macdonald Brier, 1933
The Brier
Curling in Toronto
Macdonald Brier
Macdonald Brier
March 1933 events in North America
1930s in Toronto